The Borneo loach (Pangio shelfordii) is a Southeast Asian species of cobitid fish. It is a river fish found on the Malay Peninsula,  Sumatra and Borneo

References 

 

Pangio
Fish described in 1903
Taxa named by Canna Maria Louise Popta